Events from the year 1879 in Canada.

Incumbents

Crown 
 Monarch – Victoria

Federal government 
 Governor General – John Campbell, Marquess of Lorne 
 Prime Minister – John A. Macdonald
 Chief Justice – William Buell Richards (Ontario) (until 10 January) then William Johnstone Ritchie (New Brunswick) (from 11 January)
 Parliament – 4th (from 13 February)

Provincial governments

Lieutenant governors 
Lieutenant Governor of British Columbia – Albert Norton Richards  
Lieutenant Governor of Manitoba – Joseph-Édouard Cauchon  
Lieutenant Governor of New Brunswick – Edward Barron Chandler  
Lieutenant Governor of Nova Scotia – Adams George Archibald     
Lieutenant Governor of Ontario – Donald Alexander Macdonald   
Lieutenant Governor of Prince Edward Island – Robert Hodgson (until July 10) then Thomas Heath Haviland 
Lieutenant Governor of Quebec – Luc Letellier de St-Just (until July 26) then Théodore Robitaille

Premiers    
Premier of British Columbia – George Anthony Walkem  
Premier of Manitoba – John Norquay 
Premier of New Brunswick – John James Fraser   
Premier of Nova Scotia – Simon Hugh Holmes  
Premier of Ontario – Oliver Mowat    
Premier of Prince Edward Island – Louis Henry Davies (until April 25) then William Wilfred Sullivan 
Premier of Quebec – Henri-Gustave Joly de Lotbinière (until October 31) then Joseph-Adolphe Chapleau

Territorial governments

Lieutenant governors 
 Lieutenant Governor of Keewatin – Joseph-Édouard Cauchon
 Lieutenant Governor of the North-West Territories – David Laird

Events

February 4 – Prince Edward Island election: William Wilfred Sullivan's Conservatives win a third consecutive majority
March 12 – Sir John A. Macdonald introduces protective tariffs on manufactured goods being imported into Canada, a transcontinental railway, and immigration to the west in his National Policy.
April 25 – Sir William Wilfred Sullivan becomes premier of Prince Edward Island, replacing Sir Louis Davies
June 5 – Ontario election: Sir Oliver Mowat's Liberals win a third consecutive majority
(date unknown) – The Toronto Industrial Exhibition opens for the first time, precursor to the Canadian National Exhibition
October 31 – Sir Joseph-Adolphe Chapleau becomes premier of Quebec, replacing Henri-Gustave de Lotbinière
December 16 – Manitoba election
December 19 – Swift Runner is hanged in Fort Saskatchewan, NWT, for murdering and then eating eight members of his own family over the previous winter. He believed he was possessed by Wendigo, a terrifying mythological creature with a ravenous appetite for human flesh

Births

January to June

January 15 – Mazo de la Roche, author (d.1961)
January 17 – Richard Gavin Reid, politician and 7th Premier of Alberta (d.1980)
January 25 – Humphrey T. Walwyn, naval officer and Governor of Newfoundland (d.1957)
February 14 – Eli Burton, physicist
March 20 – Maud Menten, medical scientist (d.1960)
May 25 – Max Aitken, 1st Baron Beaverbrook, business tycoon, politician and writer (d.1964)
June 12 – Charles Dow Richards, judge, politician and 18th Premier of New Brunswick (d.1956)

July to December
August 1 – Eva Tanguay, singer and entertainer (d.1947)
August 16 – Samuel Lawrence, politician and trade unionist (d.1959)
October 6 – James Langstaff Bowman, politician and Speaker of the House of Commons of Canada (d.1951)
October 9 – William Warren, lawyer, politician, judge and Prime Minister of Newfoundland (d.1927)
November 3 – Vilhjalmur Stefansson, Arctic explorer and ethnologist (d.1962)
November 11 – Violet McNaughton, feminist
November 25 – Joseph-Arsène Bonnier, politician (d.1962)
December 10 – P. L. Robertson, inventor (d. 1951) 
December 24 – Émile Nelligan, poet (d.1941)

Deaths
January 4 – Pierre-Alexis Tremblay, politician (b.1827)
January 16 – Octave Crémazie, poet (b.1827)
April 4 – Jean-Baptiste Thibault, missionary and a Father of Confederation (b.1810)
October 7 – William Henry Pope, lawyer, politician, judge and a Father of Confederation (b.1825)

Historical documents
 The federal government proposes to provide 100 million acres of Dominion land for the construction of the Canadian Pacific Railway for settlement.

 Report claims only self-reliance and industry can relieve distress of Indigenous people and anxiety of Metis (Note: racial stereotypes)

 Ottawa memo outlines the "utter destitution" of some Indigenous people in the Northwest Territories

 Federal commissioner reports on the dependency of Indigenous people at Fort Walsh

 Visitor fears the Metis on the Assiniboine River will not hold on to their lands much longer

 Description of Mennonite cooperative farming near Winnipeg

 All aboard the steamer Waubuno are lost in a gale on Georgian Bay

 Anti-Irish-Catholic opinion is published in the Irish Canadian

References
  

 
Years of the 19th century in Canada
Canada
1879 in North America